Altrincham General Hospital was a health facility in Market Street in Altrincham, Greater Manchester, England. It was managed by the Central Manchester University Hospitals NHS Foundation Trust.

History
The facility has its origins in the Lloyds Fever Hospital established in Market Street in 1853. It was completely rebuilt and reopened as the Altrincham Provident Dispensary and Hospital in 1870 before joining the National Health Service in 1948. After services transferred to a modern community hospital on Railway Street, Altrincham General Hospital closed in April 2015. The site in Market Street was subsequently redeveloped to create a health and wellbeing centre as well as a new home for Altrincham Library.

References

Hospitals established in 1853
1853 establishments in England
Hospitals in Greater Manchester
Defunct hospitals in England
Altrincham